Hydnophora exesa, also called horn coral or spine coral, is a coral in the genus Hydnophora.  It was described by Peter Simon Pallas in 1766.

Location 
They are found in the oceans of North and East Australia, Southeast Asia, and East Africa.

References 

Merulinidae
Marine fauna of Australia